The Cosby Show aired on the NBC television network from September 20, 1984 to April 30, 1992. There were 201 original episodes and one best-moments special, spanning a total of eight seasons.

Series overview

Episodes

Season 1 (1984–85)
The opening credits show the Huxtable family arriving at Central Park and playing various sports there, in a series of still images. The show's theme song, titled "Kiss Me", was composed by Stu Gardner and Bill Cosby. Two different versions of the theme song were used in this season: a longer version in the pilot and one other episode, and a shorter version with a slightly different arrangement for the rest of the episodes.

The pilot was recorded in May 1984. Regular production began in July 1984, with the episode "Goodbye Mr. Fish" (#0102), which was recorded during the first week of August.

Sabrina LeBeauf appeared as Sondra Huxtable in only four episodes: the 10th, 19th, 21st, and 24th of the season.

Season 2 (1985–86)
For this season, the opening credits were changed to a series of clips of the cast dancing in a gray, featureless room. Each cast member, in descending age of their characters, dances alongside Cosby as his/her name is shown in the credits. Then as the production credits appear, Cosby is seen alone, stiffly "dancing" to the music. On the last note of the music, he quickly turns his head and looks into the camera before the image fades to black.

A new musical arrangement of the theme song was used, but it did not depart sgnificantly from the general "jazzy" feel of the first season. As before, two different versions of the theme were used, with the longer version featuring more of a synth beat than the shorter. Midway through the season, following her marriage to NBC sportscaster Ahmad Rashad, Phylicia Ayers-Allen's name in the opening credits was changed to Phylicia Rashād. (The diacritic was dropped in season five, when her credit was changed to Phylicia Rashad.) After producer Caryn Sneider got married, her credit was also changed to use her married name, Caryn Sneider Mandabach.

Sabrina Le Beauf (as Sondra) became a regular cast member in this season, appearing in 9 of the 25 episodes.

Season 3 (1986–87)
This season's opening credits featured the cast dancing to Latin jazz in a bluish gray room. As in the previous season, Cosby dances alone as the production credits appear and quickly turns his head to look into the camera on the final musical note. Again, two versions of the sequence were used, however, unlike in previous seasons, the long and short versions differed only in their editing, not in the sound of the music.

Phylicia Rashad was pregnant throughout much of this season, so the crew hid her stomach for most of the season using such devices as kitchen counters or bed covers. She did not appear in the 13th and 14th episodes of the season.

Despite continuing to be credited as series regulars, Sabrina Le Beauf (Sondra) did not appear in 17 of the season's 25 episodes and Lisa Bonet (Denise) in 14 of the episodes.

Season 4 (1987–88)
This season's opening sequence features the cast dancing to a vocal jazz rendition of the theme performed by Bobby McFerrin. Bill Cosby is seen at the end of the credits dancing to the music as the producer credits appear and at the end, he quickly turns his head, takes off his top hat, and looks into the camera. Unlike the first three seasons, the opening credits featured the cast wearing formal 1930s-style clothing. Cosby wears a top hat and tails, Tempestt Bledsoe a United States Navy uniform, and Malcolm-Jamal Warner a business suit. Geoffrey Owens (Elvin) is introduced to the regular cast by Cosby leading him into Sabrina LeBeauf's shot (neither Owens nor LaBeauf appeared in the majority of episodes in this season). Before the producer credits, Cosby briefly holds a picture of Lisa Bonet. Bonet did not appear as main cast this season, having departed for the spinoff series, A Different World; instead, she made three guest appearances.

Season 5 (1988–89)
The opening sequence in this season featured the cast in Caribbean-style clothing dancing on a veranda to an orchestral version of "Kiss Me" arranged by James DePreist, and performed by the Oregon Symphony Orchestra. This opening credit sequence, choreographed by Geoffrey Holder, was the only one to show the cast dancing together instead of separately. The first seven episodes included a closing-theme version of this orchestration that was identical to the one used to open the show. The remaining fifteen episodes closed with a funk/jazz version of the theme.

In this season Lisa Bonet continued to guest star occasionally as Denise. Series regulars Sabrina Le Beauf and Geoffrey Owens again appeared in fewer than half of the season's episodes.

Season 6 (1989–90)
In the opening sequence for seasons 6 and 7, the cast danced on a stage with a backdrop that displayed the marquee of the Apollo Theater in Harlem. A classical jazz arrangement of "Kiss Me," featuring Craig Handy on saxophone, was used for the theme. When the credits end, instead of looking at the camera, Cosby walks off the stage, commenting, "This is the best elevator music I've ever heard!" This line was cut out of the credits when they were used in season 7.

Season 7 (1990–91)
This season's opening credits sequence originally was to use a mural entitled "Street of Dreams," painted by inner-city youth from the Creative Arts Workshop in Harlem. The producers discarded the idea when their lawyers said that in order to use the mural, they would have to get permission from all 63 young artists. Instead, a new mural was produced that combined some of the elements of the original and used many of the same colors. The owners of the mural threatened to sue and denounced the show for ripping off the children. Carsey-Werner tried to negotiate a settlement with Creative Arts Workshop, but Bill Cosby decided to replace the opening credits with the version from the previous season. Only four episodes featured the original season-seven opening credits. In all other episodes in the show's original run, and in all repeats as well as in syndication, only the replacement sequence was used. However, some international prints use the original sequence for the first four episodes.

New cast member Erika Alexander was featured in the original season-seven sequence, but only her name and role are listed in the replacement sequence. The spoken phrase "This is the best elevator music I've ever heard!" was also removed, except for one episode in 1991.

Throughout this season, Cosby was often seen wearing a small black button with the letters "SD Jr." as a tribute to Sammy Davis Jr., who died in May 1990.

Season 8 (1991–92)
The mural inspired by "Street of Dreams", originally painted by inner-city youth from the Creative Arts Workshop in Harlem, was finally used full-time in season eight. The cast now danced in the sequence to a hip-hop blend that featured Lester Bowie on trumpet. The scenes of Bonet and Phillips in the original opening sequence were removed. After the controversy from the previous season, the producers gave recognition to the painters of the original mural in the closing credits. Malcolm-Jamal Warner wore glasses in this set of opening credits, but not in any episodes. At the end of the sequence, like he did in other seasons, Cosby turns his head and looks into the camera.

A few episodes from season seven used this opening, albeit with Lisa Bonet and Joseph C. Philips in the opening credits, and at the end of the sequence, Bill Cosby would walk off and say, "Yo, chill out! Don't put your face in the mud, Pally!".

The final episode "And So We Commence" features an extended sequence, with clips of each cast member dancing from the opening credits of every season (except season 1, which did not have dancing in the opening credits). The finale was taped on Friday, March 6, 1992, under production codes 0823 and 0824.

A running gag throughout this season involves the house's front doorbell, which malfunctions in a variety of bizarre ways despite Cliff's attempts to fix it.

Notes

References

External links
 The official guide to all episodes – Carsey-Werner Television

Episodes
Lists of American sitcom episodes

it:I Robinson#Episodi